Alexander Igorevich Khokhlachev (US pronunciation: KOH-klah-chawv; ; born September 9, 1993) is a Russian professional ice hockey forward who is currently playing for Spartak Moscow in the Kontinental Hockey League (KHL). He was selected by the Boston Bruins, 40th overall, in the 2011 NHL Entry Draft.

Playing career
Khokhlachev played in the 2006 Quebec International Pee-Wee Hockey Tournament with the Moscow Selects youth team. He was selected 23rd overall in the 2010 Canadian Hockey League Import Draft by the Windsor Spitfires. After finishing the 2009–10 season with MHK Spartak in the MHL in Russia, Khokhlachev signed with the Spitfires for the 2010–11 OHL season.

On July 1, 2012, the Boston Bruins announced they had signed Khokhlachev to an entry level deal. Khokhlachev signed with Spartak Moscow of the Kontinental Hockey League (KHL) to start the 2012–13 season, but returned to Windsor to play for the Spitfires after just 26 games in the KHL. After 29 games in Windsor the Bruins recalled Khokhlachev to the Providence Bruins of the American Hockey League (AHL) where he finished the season.

To start the 2013–14 season Khokhlachev attended Boston Bruins training camp but was assigned to the Providence Bruins on September 20, 2013. On April 13, 2014, Khokhlachev made his NHL debut skating 15:14 with the Boston Bruins in a 3–2 loss to the New Jersey Devils. His first NHL appearance during the 2014–15 Boston Bruins season occurred on November 21, 2014, as Khokhlachev scored the shootout tiebreaker goal for a 4–3 Bruins road win over the Columbus Blue Jackets.

In May 2016, Khokhlachev reportedly left the Bruins for the Kontinental Hockey League of his native Russia - reports in the USA stated that he had signed a contract with SKA Saint Petersburg. It was later confirmed that on July 1, 2016, Khokhlachev signed a two-year deal with SKA Saint Petersburg, with his NHL rights still to be held by the Bruins.

In the 2016–17 season, Khokhlachev was limited to just 25 regular season games, hampered by injury in registering just 5 goals and 10 points. He appeared in 9 post-season games as SKA claimed the Gagarin Cup. On August 18, 2017, Khokhlachev was traded approaching his final year of contract by SKA in a return to former club, Spartak Moscow, in exchange for Yaroslav Dyblenko.

Khokhlachev played in three further seasons with Spartak before he was traded to Avangard Omsk in exchange for Sergei Shirokov prior to the 2020–21 season on 3 May 2020.

Personal life
Khokhlachev's father, Igor, played professional hockey for two seasons in Russia.

Career statistics

Regular season and playoffs

International

Awards and honours

References

External links

1993 births
Living people
Avangard Omsk players
Boston Bruins draft picks
Boston Bruins players
HC Spartak Moscow players
JHC Spartak players
Providence Bruins players
Russian ice hockey centres
SKA Saint Petersburg players
Ice hockey people from Moscow
Windsor Spitfires players